Timothy K. Wilcots (born February 12, 1972), better known by the stage name Latrice Royale, is an American drag performer, recording artist, and reality television personality. She is best known for her appearances on the fourth season of RuPaul's Drag Race in 2012 and on the first and fourth seasons of RuPaul's Drag Race All Stars.  She finished fourth on her original season; in its final episode, she was crowned Miss Congeniality. She placed fifth on the fourth season of All Stars.

Life and career
Wilcots was born in California and raised in Compton, a city in Greater Los Angeles. While growing up, he did not have a relationship with his father.

Royale's first foray into drag was dressing up as Wanda, a character from American sketch comedy show In Living Color, to amuse his friends. While in his twenties, in the mid-1990s, he performed in his first drag show: it was at the Copa Night Club in Fort Lauderdale, Florida. Her drag mother is Tiffany Arieagus.

After coming into the public eye, Wilcots was ordained as a minister. The first wedding that he performed was for his friend Daniel in upstate New York in 2013. Royale is a supporter of marriage equality, though he believes that it should not be called "gay marriage", stating, "It's a man and a man, and a woman and a woman getting married, and I think it is special and unique. So why not identify and celebrate it as something special and unique, and not lump it in with the same thing that has been going on for years?"

RuPaul's Drag Race Franchise

RuPaul's Drag Race season 4
In May 2011, RuPaul's Drag Race, a drag competition produced as reality television, opened auditions for the show's fourth season; acting on a dare, Wilcots submitted an audition video. His audition was accepted, and he was cast for the show; production began later that year. The fourth season premiered on January 30, 2012. He ultimately placed fourth in the competition and was eliminated in the 11th episode, which aired on April 9, 2012. Viewers voted him Miss Congeniality, and he was crowned in the season finale. Royale competed as a "plus-size" queen. He competed against twelve other queens, including Sharon Needles, Phi Phi O'Hara, Willam Belli, and Cher impersonator Chad Michaels.

Royale made it into the top four—along with Needles, Michaels, and O'Hara—and won two challenges along the way, including when she acted in a mock sitcom in "Queens Behind Bars". When Royale was cut from the competition, Entertainment Weekly called the elimination "shocking". When he was eliminated, Royale said to show host RuPaul, "You have changed my life forever. You have changed the world of drag forever. I love you and respect you so much, and thank you for seeing something special in me. Thank you." Guest judges in attendance were Wynonna Judd and Rose McGowan; Royale's words brought tears to McGowan's eyes.

Sharon Needles won the crown for season 4. In the season finale, it was announced that Royale would appear on RuPaul's Drag U, which aired later that year. After winning a public fan vote, Royale was crowned as Miss Congeniality of season 4.

RuPaul's Drag Race All Stars season 1

After RuPaul's Drag Race, Royale went on tour across the United States, performing at a number of different venues. When he had the opportunity to appear on RuPaul's Drag Race All Stars, Royale had to cancel tour dates to appear in the show.

For All Stars, Royale competed against Chad Michaels, Raven, Jujubee, Shannel, Alexis Mateo, Yara Sofia, Manila Luzon, Nina Flowers, Tammie Brown, Pandora Boxx, and Mimi Imfurst. For the competition, the queens were paired together, which was a departure from the rest of the RuPaul competitions where everyone competed alone. Royale and Luzon both chose to be together, and as a team they won the first challenge of the season.

On the third episode of the season, after not performing well with the street-punking challenge, Luzon and Jujubee faced off in the lip syncing challenge to represent each of their teams. Jujubee was paired with Raven. In the end, Royale and Luzon were sent home. During their elimination, RuPaul told them, "Manila and Latrice, my brainy and courageous queens. I think I’m going to miss you the most. Now, sashay away."

RuPaul's Drag U
In 2012, Royale joined the cast of RuPaul's Drag U for its third and final season. Other "professors" included  JuJubee, Manila Luzon, Raja, Raven, Shannel, Alexis Mateo, Mariah, Chad Michaels, Willam, Morgan McMichaels, Pandora Boxx, Delta Work, and Sharon Needles.

RuPaul's Drag Race All Stars season 4

In November 2018, Royale was announced as a cast member for All Stars 4, joining fellow All Stars season 1 cast member Manila Luzon for their second All Stars competition; the pair are the first Drag Race alumni to compete on two All Stars seasons. They are also the second and third contestants to compete on three separate seasons of the show (excluding specials) following Shangela Laquifa Wadley. Royale was originally eliminated fourth, sent home by Mo Heart, but was brought back into the competition during the LalapaRuza episode. After her elimination she won episode seven and eliminated Valentina from the competition. In the subsequent episode, she was saved from elimination by Naomi Smalls. Royale was eliminated again in episode nine by Trinity the Tuck, ultimately placing fifth overall.

RuPaul's Drag Race Holi-slay Spectacular
In December 2018, Royale competed in the Drag Race television special RuPaul's Drag Race Holi-slay Spectacular.

Other performances
In January 2014, Royale released her debut single "Weight", which was endorsed by Logo TV. A remix EP was released in March that year. Later that year in September 2014, Royale introduced and then performed with Jennifer Hudson at the CBS Fashion Rocks charity fundraiser event. Hudson stated that working with Royale "Gave me life."

As of 2014, Royale works at the Palace Bar in South Beach, Florida. Of working there, Royale stated, "I love this place NOT because I work there, but because it is the Ultimate Experience.. It’s outside right on the Beach. Beautiful People, Great Food/Drinks and the Drag Shows are amazing!"

In 2016, Royale appeared alongside Peaches Christ and RuPaul's Drag Race alum Willam in Mister Act, an off-Broadway gender-flipped parody of the film Sister Act.

In March 2016, Royale released her EP, Here's to Life: Latrice Royale Live in the Studio. In 2018 and 2019, Royale took Here's to Life on tour and performed her Shirley Horn-inspired act in cities across Canada and the United States.

In June 2019, a panel of judges from New York magazine placed Royale tenth on their list of "the most powerful drag queens in America", a ranking of 100 former RuPaul's Drag Race contestants.

In September 2022, Latrice Royale will headline the Life Is Beautiful Music & Art Festival comedy lineup.

Personal life 

In 2001, Wilcots was arrested in Fort Lauderdale, Fla. on felony charges for carrying marijuana and Klonopin without a prescription. In 2006, he missed a mandatory probation meeting, violating the terms of his probation, and was sentenced to eighteen months in prison. After the passage of 2018 Florida Amendment 4, Wilcots regained his right to vote.

Wilcots proposed to Christopher Hamblin in June 2016. The couple were married in Atlanta, Georgia on September 29, 2018. Attendees included Drag Race alumni and other drag performers.

Wilcots is a Christian.

Discography

EPs

Singles

Other appearances

Filmography

Television

Music videos

Film

Theatre

Web series

Awards and nominations

References

External links
 
 
 

1972 births
Living people
African-American drag queens
American gay actors
LGBT African Americans
LGBT people from California
LGBT people from Florida
People from Compton, California
Latrice Royale
Latrice Royale
LGBT Christians